The Greensburg Red Wings were a Class D Minor League Baseball team based in Greensburg, Pennsylvania. The team was a member of the Pennsylvania State Association, from - and played all of its home games at Offutt Field. The team's name often changed throughout their short existence. They began as the Greensburg Trojans, an affiliate of the St. Louis Cardinals. However, in  when the Brooklyn Dodgers took over the team, they were renamed the Greensburg Green Sox. Finally, the team was called the Greensburg Senators, after their final affiliate, the Washington Senators, in 1939.

Notable moments
In the summer of 1936, the Major League Baseball's St. Louis Cardinals, behind Pepper Martin, defeated the Greensburg Red Wings, 11–0, in front of 1,500 spectators at Offutt Field. In 1937, the Greensburg Green Sox was instrumental in getting funds for lights at Offutt Field in the city, setting the stage for night high school football, which debuted that fall. The field hosted minor league teams that were affiliated with the Cardinals, Washington Senators, and Brooklyn Dodgers

Major League alumni
Johnny Blatnik (1939 Senators)
Pete Center (1934 Trojans/1935 Red Wings)
Joe Cleary (1938 Green Sox)
Pat Cooper (1936 Red Wings)
Red Davis (1935 Red Wings)
Stan Ferens (1937 Green Sox/1939 Senators)
Nick Goulish (1938 Green Sox)
Otto Huber (1936 Red Wings)
Ken Holcombe (1938 Green Sox)
Eddie Lopat (1937 Green Sox)
Rube Melton (1936 Red Wings)
Heinie Mueller (1935 Red Wings)
Eddie Morgan (1934 Trojans)
Lynn Myers (1934 Trojans)
Bob Scheffing (1935 Red Wings)
Lou Scoffic (1934 Trojans)
Bud Souchock (1939 Senators)
Tom Sunkel (1934 Trojans)

Season-by-season

References

External links
Greensburg Trojans/Red Wings/Green Sox/Senators at BaseballReference.com

Baseball teams established in 1934
Defunct minor league baseball teams
Pennsylvania State Association teams
Greensburg, Pennsylvania
Brooklyn Dodgers minor league affiliates
Washington Senators minor league affiliates
St. Louis Cardinals minor league affiliates
1934 establishments in Pennsylvania
1939 disestablishments in Pennsylvania
Sports clubs disestablished in 1939
Defunct baseball teams in Pennsylvania
Baseball teams disestablished in 1939